Herpetogramma yaeyamense is a moth in the family Crambidae. It was described by Hiroshi Yamanaka in 2003. It is found in Japan's Ryukyu Islands.

References

Moths described in 2003
Herpetogramma
Moths of Japan